Stephen Johnson may refer to: 

 Stephen Johnson (minister) (1724–1786), Connecticut minister and pamphleteer
 Stephen Johnson (missionary) (1803–1886), first Protestant missionary to Fuzhou
 Stephen C. Johnson, computer scientist, mathematician and Unix specialist
 Stephen C. Johnson (state senator), New York State Senator 1844 to 1847 
 Stephen E. Johnson (born 1955), U.S. Navy admiral
 Stephen L. Johnson (born 1951), career civil servant and U.S. Administrator of the Environmental Protection Agency (EPA)
 Stephen Maxwell Johnson (fl.1980s–present), Australian filmmaker
 Stephen R. Johnson (1952–2015), animator and music video director who has worked with Peter Gabriel and Talking Heads
 Stephen Baron Johnson (born 1972), American artist
 Stephen Douglas Johnson (1963–2003), American banking lawyer and lobbyist
 Stephen T. Johnson (born 1950), United States Marine Corps general
 Stephen Johnson (ice hockey), retired player for Hull Stingrays

See also
 Steve Johnson (disambiguation)
 Steven Johnson (disambiguation)
 Stevens–Johnson syndrome